Rocky Point was a station on the Wading River Extension on the Port Jefferson Branch of the Long Island Rail Road. This abandoned station was just east Broadway between King Road & Prince Road, along what is now access for Long Island Power Authority power lines.

History
Rocky Point station was originally built in 1895 during the extension of the Port Jefferson Branch to Wading River, which was once slated to continue eastward and rejoin the Main Line at either Riverhead or Calverton. A station house was added in 1898 and was later expanded with canopies in 1928 to accommodate crowds of passengers during times when building lots were sold at discount prices.

The line east of Port Jefferson, which included the Rocky Point station, was abandoned in 1938, and the station house was moved a short distance became a lumber yard which survived into the 21st Century. The right-of-way is now owned by the Long Island Power Authority and used for power lines, but there are plans to create a rail trail for bicycling, running, and walking. The Thurber Lumber Yard no longer exists. After the lumber yard closed, the property was rezoned to permit multifamily development. The developer plans to construct senior citizen apartments and renovate the former station house, turning it over to Rocky Point's civic association for use as a VFW museum.

Bibliography

References

External links
Wading River Extension (Unofficial LIRR History.com)
Wading River Branch (Arrt's Arrchives)
Former Rocky Point Long Island Rail Road station (Road & Rail Pictures)
Trains Are Fun.com:
Wading River Extension
Bob Emery Map of Rocky Point Station & Vicinity

Former Long Island Rail Road stations in Suffolk County, New York
Railway stations in the United States opened in 1895
Railway stations closed in 1938
1895 establishments in New York (state)
1938 disestablishments in New York (state)